Allan Layton (August 20, 1919 – January 18, 1984) known by his ring name Lord Athol Layton, was an English-Australian professional wrestler, amateur boxer, and professional wrestling commentator, best remembered as being a major wrestling attraction in the 1950s and 1960s as both a tag-team and singles wrestler. As a tag team performer, he formed a memorable team with Lord James Blears, with whom he won various championships throughout the United States and Canada. As a singles wrestler, he drew large crowds particularly in Toronto against Billy Watson and The Sheik and in Detroit against Dick the Bruiser. He also appeared as a longtime color commentator for wrestling television shows in the Ontario, New York, Ohio and Michigan territories.

Early life
Born in the county of Surrey in England, Layton moved with his family to Australia at the age of 13. He served in the Australian Imperial Forces during World War II, where he was Australia's Heavyweight Amateur Boxing champion for two years. At some point prior to his service, he met his wife Leah, with whom he settled down to run a pub with after his discharge from military services.

Professional wrestling career
Layton became interested in a career in professional wrestling after seeing a wrestling show visiting his town. Through a friend, with little experience or training, he had his first wrestling match in Singapore in 1949. Shortly thereafter, Layton went back to England to hone his craft in professional wrestling. After this training, he arrived in Toronto and began wrestling full-time for promoter Frank Tunney's Toronto, Canada-based 'Maple Leaf' territory. He would make his Maple Leaf Gardens debut in November 1950, in the main event bout against Ski Hi Lee.

A heel in the early part of his career, Layton would develop into a babyface. In 1953, he faced Lou Thesz for the NWA World Heavyweight Championship at Maple Leaf Gardens.

In 1952, he formed a tag team with Lord James Blears. Managed by Captain Leslie Holmes, in 1953 they won the NWA World Tag Team Championship (Chicago version) in NWA Chicago. They would go on to capture many tag team championships in various territories throughout the United States and Canada including the Ohio-New York version of the NWA World Tag Team Championship on two occasions. Layton would also win tag team championships with Bobo Brazil in August 1970 in Detroit and Ilio DiPaolo in November 1959 for the Midwest Wrestling Association.

In Detroit in August 1962, as a fan favorite, Layton beat Dick the Bruiser for the United States Heavyweight Championship. He went on to win the title again in 1963. Owing to concerns over an eye injury, Layton wrestled his final match in 1976 at Maple Leaf Gardens, teaming with Lou Klein in a tag-team match against the Kelly Twins

As early as June 1961 Layton was working as a television commentator for the Tunney promotion for the live TV wrestling show on CBLT Toronto and later at CHCH in Hamilton, Ontario. He excelled in this position and worked for Ed Farhat in Detroit on WXON as well. He also performed as a color commentator in various territories including Cleveland and Toronto.

Personal life
Throughout his career, Layton was a regular volunteer, working on behalf of disabled and underprivileged children. He was awarded the Ontario Medal for Good Citizenship in 1983 for his charitable work, one year before his passing.

He gained Canadian citizenship in 1958

Athol Layton died at the age of 62 on January 18, 1984, at his home in Mississauga, Ontario as the result of a massive heart attack, myocardial infarction.

Championships and accomplishments

Amateur Boxing 
Heavyweight Amateur Boxing Champion (Australia), two years during the Second World War period

Professional wrestling 
National Wrestling Alliance
NWA World Tag Team championship (Chicago/Indianapolis version) w/Lord James Blears
NWA World Tag Team Championship (Detroit version) w/Bobo Brazil
NWA World Tag Team championship (Ohio-New York version) (four times; two times with Lord James Blears and two times with Ilio DiPaolo)
NWA Canadian Open Tag Team championship (Toronto version) w/Billy Watson
NWA Hawaii Tag Team championship w/Tom Rice
NWA (San Francisco) Pacific Coast Tag Team championship w/James Blears (two times)
Midwest Wrestling Association
MWA Ohio Tag Team championship w/Ilio DiPaolo
Worldwide Wrestling Associates
WWA International Television Tag Team Championship w/James Blears (two times)
American Wrestling Association
AWA United States Heavyweight championship (Detroit version) (two times)

References

1921 births
1984 deaths
20th-century professional wrestlers
Australian male boxers
Australian male professional wrestlers
English male boxers
English male professional wrestlers
Sportspeople from Rugby, Warwickshire
Professional wrestling announcers
Sportspeople from Surrey
British emigrants to Australia
Australian Army personnel of World War II
NWA Canadian Open Tag Team Champions